Malinska-Dubašnica is a municipality in the Primorje-Gorski Kotar county on the island Krk of in western Croatia. Its centre is Malinska. There are 2,726 inhabitants, with 90% Croats. It was established as a municipality in 1993.

The municipal government is located in the town hall. Built in 1920, it is the former hotel Jadran.

The former village of Dubašnica is part of the name of the municipality due to its historical importance, as it had been the seat of the municipality grouping the villages of modern Malinska-Dubašnica for centuries before its disappearance by a malaria epidemic in the 18th century. Today, Dubašnica can also refer to a region that covers the same villages and territory as Malinska-Dubašnica.

Settlements within Malinska-Dubašnica 
 Malinska - 965
 Barušići - 25
 Bogovići - 317
 Kremenići - 75
 Ljutići - 9
 Maršići - 10
 Milčetići - 245
 Milovčići - 124
 Oštrobradić - 86
 Porat - 192
 Radići - 175
 Sabljići - 21
 Sršići - 0
 Strilčići - 3
 Sveti Anton - 149
 Sveti Ivan - 72
 Sveti Vid Miholjice - 261
 Turčić - 22
Vantačići - 214
 Zidarići - 110
Žgombići - 59

Partner communities 
 Güttenbach

Notable residents 
 Branko Fučić

References

External links 
 Official site of the municipality Malinska
 Malinska tourist board
 Malinska web site

Krk
Municipalities of Croatia
Populated places in Primorje-Gorski Kotar County
Seaside resorts in Croatia